Sesia is a genus of moths in the family Sesiidae.

Species
Sesia apiformis (Clerck, 1759)
Sesia bembeciformis (Hübner, [1803-1806])
Sesia flavicollis (Hampson, [1893])
Sesia gloriosa (Le Cerf, 1914)
Sesia himachalensis  Kallies & de Freina, 2009
Sesia huaxica  Xu, 1995
Sesia ladakhensis  Špatenka, 1990
Sesia nirdhoji  Petersen & Lingenhöle, 1998
Sesia oberthueri (Le Cerf, 1914)
Sesia przewalskii (Alpheraky, 1882)
Sesia ruficollis  Petersen & Lingenhöle, 1998
Sesia siningensis (Hsu, 1981)
Sesia solitera  Špatenka & Arita, 1992
Sesia tibetensis  Arita & Xu, 1994b
Sesia timur (Grum-Grshimailo, 1893)
Sesia yezoensis (Hampson, 1919)
Sesia ignicollis (Hampson, [1893])
Sesia ommatiaeformis (Moore, 1891)
Sesia repanda (Walker, 1856)
Sesia spartani  Eichlin & Taft, 1988
Sesia tibialis (Harris, 1839)

References

Sesiidae
Taxa named by Johan Christian Fabricius
Moth genera